Live at the Loft is the second album by Danish jazz saxophonist Lotte Anker with her trio with pianist Craig Taborn and drummer Gerald Cleaver, which was recorded in 2005 at the Loft in Cologne and released on the Danish ILK label.

Reception

In his review for AllMusic, Michael G. Nastos states "While this recording only scratches the surface of their vast collective potential, it does give an indication of how much they enjoy and respect each other's company, and their high level of musicianship."

The Point of Departure review by Stuart Broomer says "It’s an extremely deliberate trio, a group in which each member is able to insert marked gestures. It’s also a very patient group, willing to develop long, gradual tension curves that arch through a panoply of minor details and events."

Track listing
All compositions by Anker/Taborn/Cleaver
 "Magic Carpet" – 26:38
 "Real Solid" – 20:20
 "Berber" – 8:19

Personnel
Lotte Anker – alto sax, tenor sax
Craig Taborn – piano
Gerald Cleaver - drums

References

2009 live albums
Lotte Anker live albums